Mildred Shapley Matthews (February 15, 1915 – February 11, 2016) was a book editor and writer known for astronomy books. She was the daughter of astronomers Harlow Shapley and Martha Betz Shapley; her father named the asteroid 878 Mildred for her.

Personal life
Mildred Shapley, one of five siblings (the others were all boys) born to Harlow Shapley and Martha Betz Shapley, attended the University of Michigan where she met her future husband, Ralph Matthews. The couple married in 1937, and moved to Altadena, California in 1945, where they lived for over 30 years and raised three of their four children. 

A widow, she died four days before her 101st birthday in Pasadena, California, survived by her four children, including June Lorraine Matthews, a brother, and a large extended family.

References

Women science writers
American book editors
University of Arizona people
American centenarians
1915 births
2016 deaths
University of Michigan alumni
Women centenarians